Alison R. Byerly is an American academic, who is serving as the 12th president of Carleton College in Northfield, Minnesota. She was previously the 17th president of Lafayette College in Easton, Pennsylvania.

Early life
Byerly was born in Glenside, Pennsylvania, in Montgomery County in 1961. She earned a bachelor of arts degree with honors in English at Wellesley College in 1983, a master of arts in English at the University of Pennsylvania in 1984, and a doctorate in English from Penn in 1989 where she was awarded a University Fellowship, the Dean's Fellowship, Dean's Award for Distinguished Teaching, and Mellon Dissertation Fellowship. At Wellesley, she was awarded Wellesley's Jacqueline Award in English Composition and Mary C. Lyons Prize in Writing.

Career
Byerly's area of specialty is the intersection of literature and other media with research focus on Victorian literature, culture and media; digital humanities; technology and the liberal arts.

Byerly was at Middlebury College from 1989, serving as provost and executive Vice President at Middlebury College in Vermont from 2007 to 2012. She has been a visiting scholar at Massachusetts Institute of Technology, Stanford University, and Oxford University.

Byerly became president of Lafayette College in 2013, and in 2016 launched a 10-year plan to increase the student body by 16 percent, more than double the financial aid budget, and create 40 new faculty positions with a goal of allowing Lafayette to admit more students without regard for their ability to pay. By 2019, the aid budget had grown by 30 percent, the student body by 100 students, and the faculty by 11 positions. Under Byerly's leadership, Lafayette also launched and completed its largest-ever fund-raising effort, and opened its largest capital project ever, the Rockwell Integrated Sciences Center. On October 6, 2020 she announced her decision to retire at Lafayette effective the end of the school year.

In August 2021, Byerly became president of Carleton College.

Personal life
Byerly is married to Stephen Jensen, a medical editor. They have a daughter and a son. She is also the owner of three zebra finches.

She is known to students at both Carleton and Lafayette Colleges as "Allie B."

Published works
She has written Realism, Representation, and the Arts in Nineteenth-Century Literature (Cambridge, 1998), and Are We There Yet? Virtual Travel and Victorian Realism (U of Michigan, 2012).

References

External links
Announcement of Presidency of Carleton College
Byerly's web page
Byerly lecture: Humanities in the Digital Age

Living people
Education in Pennsylvania
Lafayette College faculty
Lafayette College trustees
Presidents of Lafayette College
1961 births
Presidents of Carleton College
Wellesley College alumni
University of Pennsylvania alumni
People from Montgomery County, Pennsylvania